Early man may refer to:
Human evolution
Early Man (album), a 2000 album by Steve Roach
Early Man (film), a 2018 Aardman Animations film
Early Man (band), a three-piece heavy metal band
Early Man (EP), their 2005 eponymous EP
"Early Man", a 2012 Judge John Hodgman podcast episode

See also
 Ancient humans (disambiguation)
 First man or woman (disambiguation)